Sidi Abou Abdallah Mohammed ben Mohammed ben Abdelwahed al-Alami al-Moussaoui al-Harraq was a well-known Moroccan Sufi poet and teacher. He was born in 1772 in Chefchaouen and died 25 August 1845 in Tétouan. He was buried in his Zawiya near Bab Almaqabir. Sidi Al-Harraq was a pupil of Muhammad al-Arabi al-Darqawi, whom he met in 1814. He wrote three diwans (collections of poetry).

References
 Al-sagir et Abdelmagid, Ishkaliyat islah al-fikr al-Sufi fi Al-qarayn (Al-Abbas Ahmed Ibn Muhammad Almahdi Ibn Ajiba et Muhammad Al-Harâq), 1994, édition Al Bayda Dar Al-Afaq Aljadida Al-Maghrib
 Muhammad Ibn Muhammad Harrâq, 1992, publication Al Shabab
 Burckhardt T., Introduction aux doctrines ésotériques de l’Islam, Lyon 1955
 Trimingham, The Sufi Orders in Islam, OU Press, 1971

Bibliography
 Al-sagir et Abdelmagid, Ishkaliyat islah al-fikr al-Sufi fi Al-qarayn (Al-Abbas Ahmed Ibn Muhammad Almahdi Ibn Ajiba et Muhammad Al-Harâq), 1994, édition: Al-Bayda, Dar Al-Afaq, Aljadida, Al-Maghrib
Muhammad Ibn Muhammad Harrâq, 1992, publication Al-Shabab
Thèse: Le Soufi Marocain Al-Harraq : la Réforme Soufie au 19é Siècle (incl. the biography of Sidi Muhammad Al Haraq  and his diwan containing songs, muwash-shah-style poems, and short poems)
CD (Misticismo) with poems by Mohammed al-Harraq, sung by Omar Metioui 

Darqawi
18th-century Moroccan poets
1772 births
1845 deaths
Moroccan Sufi writers
Moroccan Islamic religious leaders
People from Chefchaouen
18th-century Moroccan people
19th-century Moroccan people
19th-century Moroccan writers
19th-century Moroccan poets